Vidas may refer to:

People 
 Vidas Alunderis (born 1979), Lithuanian footballer who is currently unattached
 Vidas Bičiulaitis (born 1971), retired boxer from Lithuania
 Vidas Blekaitis (born 1972), Lithuanian strongman
 Vidas Dančenka (born 1973), retired Lithuanian international football player
 Vidas Ginevičius (born 1978), Lithuanian professional basketball point guard
 Vidas Kupčinskas (born 1971), Lithuanian sprint canoer 
 Vidas Mikalauskas (born 1955), Lithuanian politician representing the Social Democratic Party
 Eliyahu de Vidas (1518–1592), 16th-century rabbi in Ottoman Palestine

See also 
 Vida (Occitan literary form)
 
 Vidas cruzadas (disambiguation)